Emil Ernst Väre (28 September 1885 – 31 January 1974) was a Finnish wrestler who won the gold medals in the lightweight class at the 1912 and 1920 Summer Olympics.

Väre held the 1911 World title, the 1912 unofficial European title, and 1909 and 1911 national titles. Between 1912 and 1916 he won all his wrestling bouts. He retired after the 1920 Olympics to become a wrestling referee and coach. In the 1920s he acted a president, general-secretary, treasurer and vice-president of his wrestling club Viipurin Voimailijat and was a board member of the Finnish Wrestling Federation.

References

External links

profile

1885 births
1974 deaths
Olympic wrestlers of Finland
Wrestlers at the 1912 Summer Olympics
Wrestlers at the 1920 Summer Olympics
Finnish male sport wrestlers
Olympic gold medalists for Finland
Olympic medalists in wrestling
Medalists at the 1912 Summer Olympics
Medalists at the 1920 Summer Olympics
World Wrestling Championships medalists
Finnish wrestling coaches
19th-century Finnish people
20th-century Finnish people